Junon is a monthly Japanese fashion magazine primarily directed towards teenage girls and women. The magazine began circulation in June 1973. In 1999 the circulation of the magazine was 380,000 copies. It is part of Shufu to Sekaitsusha company. The headquarters is in Tokyo.

References

External links
  
 PLATINUM JUNON 
 Campany Info - Shufu to Seikatsu Sha Co., Ltd.
 Junon Super Boy Contest Official Website 
 Junon Super Boy Anothers Official Website
 JUNON produce Girls CONTEST 

1973 establishments in Japan
Fashion magazines published in Japan
Magazines established in 1973
Magazines published in Tokyo
Monthly magazines published in Japan
Teen magazines published in Japan
Women's fashion magazines
Women's magazines published in Japan